Klyuchi is a rural locality (a village) in Pokrovsky Selsoviet, Blagoveshchensky District, Bashkortostan, Russia. The population was 9 as of 2010. There is 1 street.

Geography 
Klyuchi is located 44 km northeast of Blagoveshchensk (the district's administrative centre) by road. Pokrovka is the nearest rural locality.

References 

Rural localities in Blagoveshchensky District